The following is a list of Canadian ambassadors to South Korea:

List
 2015–2018: Eric Walsh
 2018-present: Michael Danagher

References

Ambassadors of Canada to South Korea
South Korea
Canada